Below is a complete list of presidents of the Senate of Grenada.

Sources

External links
Presidents of the Senate

Politics of Grenada
Grenada, Senate
Grenada